Soquel High School is a high school in Soquel, California, located on Old San Jose Road. It has 1,200 students and was established in 1962. The school is operated by the Santa Cruz City High School District. The school mascot is the Knights.

Academics 
SHS offers advanced placement classes in Biology, Chemistry, Physics, English, Spanish, U.S. History, U.S. Government, Statistics, and Calculus. SHS also offers intensive English and History for grades 9 and 10. It has several CTE classes (career technology education) which values learning by doing. Such classes include the beloved Woodshop and Agriculture programs, metal shop, graphic design, and even floral design.

Music, theater, and ROP 
The SHS Music Department has a variety of different music classes- beginning band, intermediate band, varsity band, beginning jazz band, advanced jazz band, jazz singers, beginning choir, and advanced choir. Special needs Theater Arts department stages a variety of performances during fall and spring. Soquel high school is also known for its Regional Occupations Program (GSA) which includes courses in Horticulture, Floristry, Veterinary Science, Sports Occupations, Administration of Justice, graphic design, and  Cabinetry.

Athletics 
Soquel High School offers a variety of competitive sports and is part of the Santa Cruz Coast Athletic League (SCCAL) and the California Interscholastic Federation-Central Coast Section (CCS). In the fall Soquel offers Cross Country, Football, Girls Golf, Girls Tennis, Girls Volleyball, and Water Polo. The men's water polo team has been particularly successful winning 20 straight SCCAL championships and a CCS championship in 2003. In winter, Soquel offers Basketball, Soccer and Wrestling, and in the spring there is Baseball, Softball, Track & Field, Swimming & Diving, Boys Tennis, Boys Golf, and Boys Volleyball. In addition, Soquel High School students can compete in surfing and cheerleading that fall outside of the SCCAL and CCS and are listed under Club Sports.

Student body 
While the student body changes year to year it is typically comprised ethnically of:  American Indian 1%, Asian 3%, Hispanic 34%, Black 1%, White 57%, Decline to state 4%.  Typically 51% of the students are male and 49% female.  The teacher to student ratio is about 1:18.

Soquel High School was opened to students on September 11, 1962, and has approximately 1,200 students as of 2018. The high school spans 40 acres and is located on a plateau in the foothills of this Coastal California community one mile from the shores of Monterey Bay.  Its original meaning is derived from a Costanoan Indian word for "place of the willows". Students at Soquel High School reside in Capitola, Live Oak and parts of Santa Cruz, Scotts Valley, and of course Soquel.

Notable alumni
Kyra Davis, author
Linda Gustavson, Olympic Gold Medal swimmer; two other Olympic medals
David Cay Johnston, Pulitzer Prize winning investigative reporter and best-selling author
Dwight Lowery, NFL cornerback
Casey McGehee, MLB Infielder
Edmund McMillen, video game designer
Troy Miller, MLB 
John Orton, former MLB catcher
Luke Rockhold, professional mixed martial artist and former UFC middleweight champion
Chris Sharma, climber
Derek Sherinian, rock keyboardist 
Maggie Vessey, middle distance runner

References

External links
Official website

High schools in Santa Cruz County, California
Public high schools in California
1962 establishments in California